Robert Cherry may refer to:
 Robert D. Cherry, professor emeritus in the Department of Economics at Brooklyn College
 R. Gregg Cherry (1891–1957), Democratic governor of North Carolina, 1945–1949
 Bobby Frank Cherry (1930–2004), murderer
 Bob Cherry (politician) (born 1947), member of the Indiana House of Representatives
 Bob Cherry, a fictional character, see Greyfriars School